Vladyslav Oleksandrovych Pikhovych (born 11 August 1996) is a Ukrainian former figure skater. He  represented Ukraine at the 2017 Winter Universiade. Master of Sports of Ukraine (2019).

Personal life
Vladyslav Pikhovych was born in Dnipro. In addition to the figure skating school, Pikhovich trained at the theater on ice "Crystal" from 2005 to 2007. Received a bachelor's degree at the Ukrainian University of Customs and Finance in 2017. Received a master's degree at the Zaporizhzhya National Technical University in 2019. In his spare time he is engaged in coaching. In 2019, he retired and began his professional career. Joined Holiday on Ice show in 2019. Joined Royal Caribbean International in 2022.

Skating career

Early years

Vladyslav Pikhovych began skating at a relatively late age of 8 years in 2005. Until 2015, he trained in Dnipro and participated only in national competitions. Since 2015, began training in Kryvyi Rih.

2016–2017 season

Pikhovych placed the 5th place in the national championship, however among students participants he was 2nd, which allowed him to be selected to the Ukraine national student team in the 2017 Winter Universiade in Almaty, Kazakhstan.

In the 2017 Winter Universiade, he placed 34th place. He represented the Ukrainian University of Customs and Finance.

After the Universiade, Pikhovych began to training in Dnipro again.

2018–2019 season

Pikhovych placed the 7th place in the national championship, however among students participants he was 1st, which would allowed him to be selected to the Ukraine national student team in the 2019 Winter Universiade in Krasnoyarsk, Russia.

The Ministry of Education and Science of Ukraine objected to the participation of Ukrainian athletes in any sports competitions in Russia. Thus Pikhovych was unable to take part in the Universiade a second time.

In the 2019 Cup of Ukraine in Odesa, Pikhovych placed 2nd place. This result allowed him to receive the title Master of Sports of Ukraine.

Programs

Competitive highlights

References

External links 
 

Ukrainian male single skaters
1996 births
Living people
Sportspeople from Dnipro
Competitors at the 2017 Winter Universiade